Colwellia maris is a psychrophilic and Gram-negative bacterium from the genus of Colwellia with a single polar flagellum which has been isolated from seawater from the Sea of Okhotsk in Japan.

References

Alteromonadales
Bacteria described in 1998